Medal of Independence was a special military decoration issued in limited number by Grand National Assembly of Turkey in accordance with the Act 66 of November 29, 1920. It was awarded to military personnel and civilians, who had made important contributions to the country during the Turkish War of Independence. Also upon the flags of all the regiments of the Turkish National Forces, which took part in the campaigns during the occupation of Izmir between May 15, 1919 and September 9, 1922,  were bestowed a medal.

See also 
 List of recipients of the Medal of Independence with Red-Green Ribbon (Turkey)
 Turkish Armed Forces Medal of Distinguished Service
 Turkish Armed Forces Medal of Honor
 Turkish Armed Forces Medal of Distinguished Courage and Self-Sacrifice
 Turkish National Movement

References

External links 

Military awards and decorations of Turkey
Turkish War of Independence